Universal Darwinism, also known as generalized Darwinism, universal selection theory, or Darwinian metaphysics, is a variety of approaches that extend the theory of Darwinism beyond its original domain of biological evolution on Earth. Universal Darwinism aims to formulate a generalized version of the mechanisms of variation, selection and heredity proposed by Charles Darwin, so that they can apply to explain evolution in a wide variety of other domains, including psychology, linguistics, economics, culture, medicine, computer science, and physics.

Basic mechanisms
At the most fundamental level, Charles Darwin's theory of evolution states that organisms evolve and adapt to their environment by an iterative process.  This process can be conceived as an evolutionary algorithm that searches the space of possible forms (the fitness landscape) for the ones that are best adapted. The process has three components:

 variation of a given form or template. This is usually (but not necessarily) considered to be blind or random, and happens typically by mutation or recombination.
 selection of the fittest variants, i.e. those that are best suited to survive and reproduce in their given environment. The unfit variants are eliminated.
 heredity or retention, meaning that the features of the fit variants are retained and passed on, e.g. in offspring.

After those fit variants are retained, they can again undergo variation, either directly or in their offspring, starting a new round of the iteration. The overall mechanism is similar to the problem-solving procedures of trial-and-error or generate-and-test: evolution can be seen as searching for the best solution for the problem  of how to survive and reproduce by generating new trials, testing how well they perform, eliminating the failures, and retaining the successes.

The generalization made in "universal" Darwinism is to replace "organism" by any recognizable pattern, phenomenon, or system. The first requirement is that the pattern can "survive" (maintain, be retained) long enough or "reproduce" (replicate, be copied) sufficiently frequently so as not to disappear immediately. This is the heredity component: the information in the pattern must be retained or passed on. The second requirement is that during survival and reproduction variation (small changes in the pattern) can occur. The final requirement is that there  is a selective "preference" so that certain variants tend to survive or reproduce "better" than others. If these conditions are met, then, by the logic of natural selection, the pattern will evolve towards more adapted forms.

Examples of patterns that have been postulated to undergo variation and selection, and thus adaptation, are genes, ideas (memes), theories, technologies, neurons and their connections, words, computer programs, firms, antibodies, institutions, law and judicial systems, quantum states and even whole universes.

History and development 

Conceptually, "evolutionary theorizing about cultural, social, and economic phenomena" preceded Darwin, but was still lacking the concept of natural selection. Darwin himself, together with subsequent 19th-century thinkers such as Herbert Spencer, Thorstein Veblen, James Mark Baldwin and William James, was quick to apply the idea of selection to other domains, such as language, psychology, society, and culture. However, this evolutionary tradition was largely banned from the social sciences in the beginning of the 20th century, in part because of the bad reputation of social Darwinism, an attempt to use Darwinism to justify social inequality.

Starting in the 1950s, Donald T. Campbell was one of  the first and most influential authors to revive the tradition, and to formulate a generalized Darwinian algorithm directly applicable to phenomena outside of biology. In this, he was inspired by William Ross Ashby's view of self-organization and intelligence as fundamental processes of selection. His aim was to explain the development of science and other forms of knowledge by focusing on the variation and selection of ideas and theories, thus laying the basis for the domain of evolutionary epistemology. In the 1990s, Campbell's formulation of the mechanism of "blind-variation-and-selective-retention" (BVSR) was further developed and extended to other domains under the labels of "universal selection theory" or "universal selectionism" by his disciples Gary Cziko, Mark Bickhard, and Francis Heylighen.

Richard Dawkins may have first coined the term "universal Darwinism" in 1983 to describe his conjecture that any possible life forms existing outside the solar system would evolve by natural selection just as they do on Earth. This conjecture was also presented in 1983 in a paper entitled “The Darwinian Dynamic” that dealt with the evolution of order in living systems and certain nonliving physical systems.  It was suggested “that ‘life’, wherever it might exist in the universe, evolves according to the same dynamical law” termed the Darwinian dynamic.  Henry Plotkin in his 1997 book on Darwin machines makes the link between universal Darwinism and Campbell's evolutionary epistemology. Susan Blackmore, in her 1999 book The Meme Machine, devotes a chapter titled 'Universal Darwinism' to a discussion of the applicability of the Darwinian process to a wide range of scientific subject matters.

The philosopher of mind Daniel Dennett, in his 1995 book Darwin's Dangerous Idea, developed the idea of a Darwinian process, involving variation, selection and retention, as a generic algorithm that is substrate-neutral and could be applied to many fields of knowledge outside of biology. He described the idea of natural selection as a "universal acid" that cannot be contained in any vessel, as it seeps through the walls and spreads ever further, touching and transforming ever more domains. He notes in particular the field of memetics in the social sciences.

In agreement with Dennett's prediction, over the past decades the Darwinian perspective has spread ever more widely, in particular across the social sciences as the foundation for numerous schools of study including memetics, evolutionary economics, evolutionary psychology, evolutionary anthropology, neural Darwinism, and evolutionary linguistics. Researchers have postulated Darwinian processes as operating at the foundations of physics, cosmology and chemistry via the theories of quantum Darwinism, observation selection effects and cosmological natural selection. Similar mechanisms are extensively applied in computer science in the domains of genetic algorithms and evolutionary computation, which develop solutions to complex problems via a process of variation and selection.

Author D. B. Kelley has formulated one of the most all-encompassing approaches to universal Darwinism. In his 2013 book The Origin of Phenomena, he holds that natural selection involves not the preservation of favored races in the struggle for life, as shown by Darwin, but the preservation of favored systems in contention for existence. The fundamental mechanism behind all such stability and evolution is therefore what Kelley calls "survival of the fittest systems." Because all systems are cyclical, the Darwinian processes of iteration, variation and selection are operative not only among species but among all natural phenomena both large-scale and small. Kelley thus maintains that, since the Big Bang especially, the universe has evolved from a highly chaotic state to one that is now highly ordered with many stable phenomena, naturally selected.

Examples of universal Darwinist theories
The following approaches can all be seen as exemplifying a generalization of Darwinian ideas outside of their original domain of biology. These "Darwinian extensions" can be grouped in two categories, depending on whether they discuss implications of biological (genetic) evolution in other disciplines (e.g. medicine or psychology), or discuss processes of variation and selection of entities other than genes (e.g. computer programs, firms or ideas). However, there is no strict separation possible, since most of these approaches (e.g. in sociology, psychology and linguistics) consider both genetic and non-genetic (e.g. cultural) aspects of evolution, as well as the interactions between them (see e.g. gene-culture coevolution).

Gene-based Darwinian extensions
Evolutionary psychology assumes that our emotions, preferences and cognitive mechanisms are the product of natural selection
Evolutionary educational psychology applies evolutionary psychology to education
Evolutionary developmental psychology applies evolutionary psychology to cognitive development
Darwinian Happiness applies evolutionary psychology to understand the optimal conditions for human well-being
Darwinian literary studies tries to understand the characters and plots of narrative on the basis of evolutionary psychology
Evolutionary aesthetics applies evolutionary psychology to explain our sense of beauty, especially for landscapes and human bodies
Evolutionary musicology applies evolutionary aesthetics to music
Evolutionary anthropology studies the evolution of human beings
Sociobiology proposes that social systems in animals and humans are the product of Darwinian biological evolution
Human behavioral ecology investigates how human behavior has become adapted to its environment via variation and selection
Evolutionary epistemology of mechanisms studies how our abilities to gather knowledge (perception, cognition) have evolved
Evolutionary medicine investigates the origin of diseases by looking at the evolution both of the human body and of its parasites
Paleolithic diet proposes that the most healthy nutrition is the one to which our hunter-gatherer ancestors have adapted over millions of years
Paleolithic lifestyle generalizes the paleolithic diet to include exercise, behavior and exposure to the environment
Molecular evolution studies evolution at the level of DNA, RNA and proteins
Biosocial criminology studies crime using several different approaches that include genetics and evolutionary psychology
Evolutionary linguistics studies the evolution of language, biologically as well as culturally

Other Darwinian extensions
Quantum Darwinism sees the emergence of classical states in physics as a natural selection of the most stable quantum properties
Cosmological natural selection hypothesizes that universes reproduce and are selected for having fundamental constants that maximize "fitness"
Complex adaptive systems models the dynamics of complex systems in part on the basis of the variation and selection of its components
Evolutionary computation is a Darwinian approach to the generation of adapted computer programs
Genetic algorithms, a subset of evolutionary computation, models variation by "genetic" operators (mutation and recombination)
Evolutionary robotics applies Darwinian algorithms to the design of autonomous robots
Artificial life uses Darwinian algorithms to let organism-like computer agents evolve in a software simulation
Evolutionary art uses variation and selection to produce works of art
Evolutionary music does the same for works of music
Clonal selection theory sees the creation of adapted antibodies in the immune system as a process of variation and selection
Neural Darwinism proposes that neurons and their synapses are selectively pruned during brain development
Evolutionary epistemology of theories assumes that scientific theories develop through variation and selection
Memetics is a theory of the variation, transmission, and selection of cultural items, such as ideas, fashions, and traditions
Dual inheritance theory a framework for cultural evolution developed largely independently of memetics
Cultural selection theory is a theory of cultural evolution related to memetics
Cultural materialism is an anthropological approach that contends that the physical world impacts and sets constraints on human behavior.
Environmental determinism is a social science theory that proposes that it is the environment that ultimately determines human culture.
Evolutionary economics studies the variation and selection of economic phenomena, such as commodities, technologies, institutions and organizations.
Evolutionary ethics investigates the origin of morality, and uses Darwinian foundations to formulate ethical values
Big History is the science-based narrative integrating the history of the universe, earth, life, and humanity. Scholars consider Universal Darwinism to be a possible unifying theme for the discipline.

Books

 Campbell, John. Universal Darwinism: the path of knowledge.
 Cziko, Gary. Without Miracles: Universal Selection Theory and the Second Darwinian Revolution.
 Hodgson, Geoffrey Martin; Knudsen, Thorbjorn. Darwin's Conjecture: The Search for General Principles of Social and Economic Evolution.
 Kelley, D. B. The Origin of Everything via Universal Selection, or the Preservation of Favored Systems in Contention for Existence.
 Plotkin, Henry. Evolutionary Worlds without End.
 Plotkin, Henry. Darwin Machines and the Nature of Knowledge.
  Dennett, Daniel. Darwin's Dangerous Idea.

References

External links
 UniversalDarwinism.com
 UniversalSelection.com

Darwinism
Evolutionary biology
Evolution